Micrarionta opuntia, known as the prickly pear island snail, pricklypear islandsnail, or prickly pear snail, is a species of  land snail in the  family Xanthonychidae. It is endemic to California, first formally described in 1975.

The type locality is northeastern San Nicolas Island, at the base of a prickly pear (Opuntia littoralis), in a small depression.

References

opuntia
Molluscs of the United States
Gastropods described in 1975
Taxonomy articles created by Polbot